William Butler Jr. (February 1, 1790 – September 25, 1850) was a United States representative from South Carolina. He was a son of William Butler (1759–1821), brother of Andrew Butler, and father of Matthew Calbraith Butler, all of whom served in the United States Congress.

Early life
Butler was born near the present town of Saluda, South Carolina on February 1, 1790. He was a son of William Butler (1759–1821) and Behethland Foote (née Moore) Butler (1764–1853). Among his siblings was brother Andrew Butler, a Democratic U.S. Senator from North Carolina. Pierce Mason Butler was Governor of South Carolina from 1836 to 1838.

He graduated from South Carolina College at Columbia, South Carolina in 1810. He had studied medicine and was licensed to practice.

Career
During the War of 1812, he served as a United States Navy surgeon at the Battle of New Orleans. Butler served in the Navy until June 6, 1820, when he resigned.

In 1825, he moved to Greenville, South Carolina where he began practice as a country doctor. He was elected as a Whig to the Twenty-seventh Congress (March 4, 1841 – March 3, 1843). He served as agent of the Cherokee Indians from May 29, 1849, until his death the following year.

Personal life
While stationed in Rhode Island in 1819, he married Jane Tweedy Perry. She was a daughter of Christopher Raymond Perry, and was a sister to Oliver Hazard Perry and Matthew Calbraith Perry. Together, they were the parents of many children, including Matthew Calbraith Butler.

Butler died in Fort Gibson, Indian Territory (now Oklahoma) on September 25, 1850. He was buried near Van Buren, Arkansas.

References

External links

Collected Receipts of William Butler of Greenville - Greenville County Library System Digital Collections

1790 births
1850 deaths
People from Saluda, South Carolina
South Carolina Whigs
Members of the United States House of Representatives from South Carolina
University of South Carolina alumni
United States Navy personnel of the War of 1812
Butler-Belmont family
Whig Party members of the United States House of Representatives
19th-century American politicians